Portrait of a Nobleman (Spanish - Retrato de un caballero) is a c.1586 oil on canvas portrait by El Greco, originally hung in the Quinta del Duque del Arco in Royal Palace of El Pardo in Madrid but now in the Museo del Prado. Its subject is unknown.

References

1580s paintings
Nobleman
Paintings by El Greco in the Museo del Prado